A total solar eclipse occurred on Wednesday, May 17, 1882. A solar eclipse occurs when the Moon passes between Earth and the Sun, thereby totally or partly obscuring the image of the Sun for a viewer on Earth. A total solar eclipse occurs when the Moon's apparent diameter is larger than the Sun's, blocking all direct sunlight, turning day into darkness. Totality occurs in a narrow path across Earth's surface, with the partial solar eclipse visible over a surrounding region thousands of kilometres wide.
In locations as of present or today, totality was visible in Burkina Faso, Ghana, Niger, Nigeria, Chad, Libya, Egypt (African part), Suez Canal, Egypt (Asian part), Gulf of Aqaba, Saudi Arabia, Iraq, Iran, Turkmenistan, Uzbekistan, Tadjikistan, Kyrgyzstan, China and East China Sea. Totality began in Burkina Faso and ended in East China Sea. Occurring 4.2 days after perigee (Perigee on May 13, 1882), the Moon’s apparent diameter was 0.9% larger than average.

Observations 

A party of observers gathered in Egypt to watch the eclipse were greatly surprised when they observed a bright streak near to the Sun once totality began. By a remarkable coincidence, the eclipse had coincided with the perihelion passage of a Kreutz comet. The comet would otherwise have gone unnoticed—its sighting during the eclipse was the only observation of it. Photographs of the eclipse revealed that the comet had moved noticeably during the 1m50s eclipse, as would be expected for a comet racing past the Sun at almost 500 km/s. The comet is sometimes referred to as Tewfik, after Tewfik Pasha, the Khedive of Egypt at the time.

Related eclipses

Saros 126

Tritos series

Notes

References
 NASA graphic
 Googlemap
 NASA Besselian elements
 Sketchs of Solar Corona May 17, 1882

1882 05 17
1882 in science
1882 05 17
May 1882 events